Annia Cornificia Faustina Minor (Minor Latin for the younger, 160–212 AD) was a daughter of the Roman emperor Marcus Aurelius and his wife, Faustina the Younger. She was sister to Lucilla and Commodus. Her maternal grandparents were Antoninus Pius and Faustina the Elder, and her paternal grandparents were Domitia Lucilla and praetor Marcus Annius Verus. She was named in honor of her late paternal aunt Annia Cornificia Faustina.

Life 
Cornificia Faustina was born and raised in Rome and later married the African Roman politician Marcus Petronius Sura Mamertinus, who served as consul in 182. Sometime after 173, she bore him a son called Petronius Antoninus. It is possible that she and her family were at the winter camp where Marcus Aurelius died in early 180.

Her brother Commodus succeeded her father as emperor and, sometime between 190 and 192, he ordered the deaths of her husband, her son, her brother-in-law and her sister-in-law's family. Cornificia survived the political executions of Commodus and later married Lucius Didius Marinus, a powerful Roman noble of equestrian rank who served as Procurator in various provinces. He later became a tax collector and tribune of the first Praetorian cohort.

During the brief reign of Pertinax (193), she was involved in an affair with the emperor. In 212, when she was in her fifties, Caracalla ordered her death and that of her son, thus eliminating the last surviving child of Marcus Aurelius and Faustina the Younger. Historian Cassius Dio recorded the manner of her death:
 Her last words were 'My poor, unhappy soul, trapped in an unworthy body, go forth, be free, show them that you are the daughter of Marcus Aurelius!' Then she took off her ornaments, composed herself, opened her veins, and died.

References

Sources
 Septimius Severus: the African emperor, By Anthony Richard Birley Edition: 2 – 1999
 Roman social history: a sourcebook By Tim G. Parkin, Arthur John Pomeroy 2007
 A commentary on the Letters of M. Cornelius Fronto, By Michael Petrus Josephus van den Hout, Marcus Cornelius Fronto 1999
 From Tiberius to the Antonines: a history of the Roman Empire AD 14–192, by Albino Garzetti, 1974.
 Stefan Priwitzer, Faustina minor - Ehefrau eines Idealkaisers und Mutter eines Tyrannen quellenkritische Untersuchungen zum dynastischen Potential, zur Darstellung und zu Handlungsspielraeumen von Kaiserfrauen im Prinzipat (Bonn: Dr. Rudolf Habelt, 2008) (Tuebinger althistorische Studien, 6).

External links 
Did Faustina the Younger sleep around?
Dictionary of Greek and Roman Biography and Mythology
Faustina II

160 births
212 deaths
Nerva–Antonine dynasty
Cornificia Faustina
Anna Faustina
2nd-century Roman women
3rd-century Roman women
Executed ancient Roman women
People executed by the Roman Empire
Daughters of Roman emperors